Vincent "Vincy" Twomey (1929 – 30 May 1993) was an Irish hurler who played as a centre-back for the Cork senior team.

Born in Blackpool, Cork, Twomey first arrived on the inter-county scene at the age of seventeen when he first linked up with the Cork minor team before later joining the junior side. He joined the senior panel during the 1950 championship. Twomey went on to play a key role during a golden age for the team, and won three All-Ireland medals, four Munster medals and one National Hurling League medal. He was an All-Ireland runner-up on one occasion.

As a member of the Munster inter-provincial team on a number of occasions, Twomey won one Railway Cup medal. At club level he was a multiple championship medallist with Glen Rovers. Twomey also enjoyed championship success as a Gaelic footballer with St. Nicholas'.

Throughout his career Twomey made 19 championship appearances. He retired from inter-county hurling following the conclusion of the 1957 championship.

Honours

Team

Glen Rovers
Cork Senior Hurling Championship (4): 1950, 1953, 1954, 1958
St. Nicholas'
Cork Senior Football Championship (1): 1954

Cork
All-Ireland Senior Hurling Championship (3): 1952, 1953, 1954
Munster Senior Hurling Championship (4): 1952, 1953, 1954, 1956
National Hurling League (1): 1952-53
All-Ireland Junior Hurling Championship (1): 1950
Munster Junior Hurling Championship (1): 1950

Munster
 Railway Cup (1): 2000

References

1929 births
1993 deaths
All-Ireland Senior Hurling Championship winners
Cork inter-county hurlers
Glen Rovers hurlers
Munster inter-provincial hurlers
St Nicholas' Gaelic footballers